Kuzhalmannam-I  is a village in the Palakkad district, state of Kerala, India. It forms a part of the Kuzhalmannam gram panchayat, along with Kuzhalmannam-II.

Demographics
 India census, Kuzhalmannam-I had a population of 16,607 with 8,097 males and 8,510 females.

Facilities
Map view of facilities in and around Kuzalmannam

References

Villages in Palakkad district